The 2001 SCCA ProRally Season was the 29th season of the SCCA ProRally and won by Mark Lovell from England. Ten rounds were held from January 2001 to October 2001. The co-driver title went to Frank Cunningham.
The manufacturer's title went to Subaru.

Teams and Drivers

Calendar
Sno*Drift Rally won by Paul Choiniere
Cherokee Trails won by Richard Tuthill
Oregon Trail ProRally won by Mark Lovell
Rim of the World ProRally won by Mark Lovell
Susquehannock Trail ProRally won by Mark Lovell
Maine Forest Rally won by Seamus Burke
Ojibwe Forests Rally won by Mark Lovell
Wild West International ProRally won by Richard Tuthill
Prescott Forest ProRally won by Mark Lovell
Lake Superior ProRally won by Mark Lovell

References

External links
 2001 Results at rallyracingnews.com

2001 in motorsport
2001 in rallying